Mashonaland Central is a province of Zimbabwe. It has an area of 28,347 km² and a population of 1,152,520 (2012 census), representing about 8.5% of the total Zimbabwe population.

Geography

Background 
Bindura is the capital of the province. During the 2002/2003 rainy season, the area experienced heavy flooding, along with several other Zimbabwean provinces.

Mashonaland Central districts 
The province is divided into eight districts:

 Bindura
 Mbire
 Guruve
 Mount Darwin
 Rushinga
 Shamva
 Mazowe
 Muzarabani

See also 
 Provinces of Zimbabwe
 Districts of Zimbabwe

References

 
Provinces of Zimbabwe